Don't Ask Me Ask Britain is a British television comedy panel game show that has aired on ITV from 18 April until 23 May 2017 and is hosted by Alexander Armstrong with Frank Skinner and Jonathan Ross as the team captains. The series is produced by Chalkboard TV for ITV. The goal is for the two teams to second-guess what the viewers will vote for in various questions by using an app and voting along live.

Format
An app is available for iOS and Android devices where the viewers can vote along live to various questions. Skinner and Ross' teams must guess what will get the most votes. They'll get the points based on the percentage of people that went with their answer (for example, if an answer was voted by 30% of people, the team would get 30 points). There is also a round where Skinner and Ross must convince the viewers to agree with what they are arguing. They get the number of points based on what percentage agreed with them. The winner is the team with the most votes at the end of the show.

For the first three episodes, they would also go live to a family or a group of friends at their house to ask their opinion on the question. This however was scrapped from the fourth episode onwards.

Episodes
The coloured backgrounds denote the result of each of the shows:
 – Indicates Frank's team won.
 – Indicates Jonathan's team won.

International versions 
The TV format, was exported in Italy on 2015 with the title Gli italiani hanno sempre ragione (The italians are always right), aired on Rai 1 in July, and hosted by Fabrizio Frizzi.

ITV axes the show 
ITV later axed the show and it will not be returning for another series at the moment.

References

External links
 
 

2010s British comedy television series
2017 British television series debuts
2017 British television series endings
British panel games
2010s British game shows
English-language television shows
ITV comedy
ITV panel games